Eugene Klein (June 26, 1878 – April 30, 1944) of Philadelphia, Pennsylvania, was an internationally known stamp collector, stamp dealer, and auctioneer who was President of the American Philatelic Society from 1935 to 1937.

Philatelic activity
Klein was the Official Expert of the American Philatelic Society from 1911 to 1931 and its International Secretary from 1928 to 1935 and 1937 to 1944. He also served as President (1935–1937) and International Secretary again from 1937 until his death. He authored the 1940 book United States Waterway Packetmarks: Handstamped and Printed Names of Mail-Carrying Steamboats on the United States of America Inland and Coastal Waters, 1832-1899, called a seminal work by the American Philatelic Society, (APS), in a highly-collectable area.

Honors and awards
Eugene Klein was inducted into the American Philatelic Society Hall of Fame in 1944.

Inverted Jenny
Klein is remembered as the dealer who bought the sheet of the 24-cent Inverted Jenny 1918 United States air mail stamps from its finder, William T. Robey.

References

External links
 Eugene Klein writings

American philatelists
1878 births
1944 deaths
American stamp dealers
People from Philadelphia
American auctioneers
Philatelic auctioneers
American Philatelic Society